Cromac, a division of Belfast, was a UK parliamentary constituency in Ireland. It returned one Member of Parliament (MP) to the House of Commons of the United Kingdom from 1918 to 1922, using the first past the post electoral system.

Boundaries and Boundary Changes
The constituency was created by the Redistribution of Seats (Ireland) Act 1918 and comprised the western half of South Belfast, and contained the then Cromac and Windsor wards of Belfast Corporation.

Prior to the 1918 general election and after the dissolution of Parliament in 1922 the area was part of the Belfast South constituency.

Politics
The constituency was a predominantly Unionist area, with some Labour support. In the 1918 election Sinn Féin came third.

First Dáil
After the 1918 election, Sinn Féin invited all those elected for constituencies in Ireland to sit as TDs in Dáil Éireann rather than in the House of Commons of the United Kingdom. All those elected for Irish constituencies were included in the roll of the Dáil but only those elected for Sinn Féin sat in the First Dáil. In May 1921, the Dáil passed a resolution declaring that elections to the House of Commons of Northern Ireland and the House of Commons of Southern Ireland would be used as the election for the Second Dáil and that the First Dáil would be dissolved on the assembly of the new body. The area of Belfast Cromac was then represented in the Dáil by the four-seat constituency of Belfast South, which also returned no representatives for Sinn Féin.

Members of Parliament

Election

References

(Information about boundaries of the constituency derived from the map of Northern Ireland Parliament constituencies (in force from 1921) and the wards included in the Belfast UK Parliament seats (in force 1922) for which see Northern Ireland Parliamentary Election Results 1921–1972, by Sydney Elliott (Political Reference Publications 1973) and Boundaries of Parliamentary Constituencies 1885–1972, compiled and edited by F.W.S. Craig (Political Reference Publications 1972) respective

See also
 List of UK Parliament Constituencies in Ireland and Northern Ireland
 List of MPs elected in the 1918 United Kingdom general election
 Historic Dáil constituencies
 Members of the 1st Dáil

Cromac
Dáil constituencies in Northern Ireland (historic)
Constituencies of the Parliament of the United Kingdom established in 1918
Constituencies of the Parliament of the United Kingdom disestablished in 1922